The 2010–11 version of the Jordan FA Cup was the 31st edition to be played. It is the premier knockout tournament for football teams in Jordan. Team Al-Faisaly (Amman) went into this edition as the club with the most wins, at 16. Al Wahdat were the current holders and won it the Cup the second straight time.

The cup winners were guaranteed a place in the 2012 AFC Cup.

Round of 16

|colspan="3" style="background-color:#99CCCC"|5 September 2010

|-
|colspan="3" style="background-color:#99CCCC"|6 September 2010

|-
|colspan="3" style="background-color:#99CCCC"|7 September 2010

|}

Quarter-finals
8 teams play home and away matches as Knock out stage. 

|}

Semi-finals
4 teams play home and away matches as Knock out stage. 

|}

Final

|}

External links
Soccerway.com

Jordan FA Cup seasons
Jordan
Cup